José María Orantes (born in Fraijanes—died in Guatemala City) was a Guatemalan military man, appointed acting president of the Republic of Guatemala from 23 June 1882 to January 5, 1883.

Biography
He was appointed by the Guatemalan National Assembly as a substitute for President Justo Rufino Barrios during his absence from the country. Justo Rufino Barrios had to leave for New York with the purpose of negotiating a boundary dispute with Mexico, 12 August 1882. A second part of his journey was to gain approval for a proposed confederation of the Central American states. Orantes returned the power to General Justo Rufino Barrios on his return the 6 January 1883.

See also 
 Justo Rufino Barrios

Notes and references

References

Presidents of Guatemala
Vice presidents of Guatemala
Guatemalan generals
Liberal Party (Guatemala) politicians
People from Guatemala Department
19th-century Guatemalan people
Date of death unknown
Date of birth unknown